Paopi 8 - Coptic Calendar - Paopi 10

The ninth day of the Coptic month of Paopi, the second month of the Coptic year. On a common year, this day corresponds to October 6, of the Julian Calendar, and October 19, of the Gregorian Calendar. This day falls in the Coptic season of Akhet, the season of inundation.

Commemorations

Saints 

 The departure of Pope Omanius, the seventh Patriarch of the See of Saint Mark 
 The departure of Saint Simon, the Bishop

Other commemorations 

 The Eclipse of the Sun (978 AD)

References 

Days of the Coptic calendar